Frank or Francis Watt may refer to:

Frank Watt (baseball) (1902–1956), American baseball pitcher (Philadelphia Phillies)
Frank Watt (footballer) (1866–?), Scottish international footballer (Queen's Park and Rangers)
Frank Watt (football manager) (fl. 1895–1935), secretary of Newcastle United FC
Frank Watt (politician) (1896–1971), Scottish Unionist MP for Edinburgh Central